Baby Boom is a 1987 American romantic comedy-drama film directed by Charles Shyer, written by Nancy Meyers and Shyer, and produced by Meyers and Bruce A. Block for United Artists. It stars Diane Keaton as a yuppie who discovers that a long-lost cousin has died, leaving her a fourteen-month-old baby girl as inheritance.

The film received generally favorable reviews and was a modest box-office success during its original run, eventually grossing $26 million. The film spawned a television series of the same name (1988–1989) and was nominated for two Golden Globe Awards.

Plot

J. C. Wiatt is a driven Manhattan management consultant (nicknamed the "Tiger Lady") committed to her demanding and high-profile job. She lives with her boyfriend Steven Buchner, an investment banker. They both are happily focused on their careers and have no interest in having children. Notified that a distant cousin has died and left her a bequest, J.C. is shocked to discover that her "inheritance" is the cousin's orphaned toddler, Elizabeth.

Unwilling to disrupt her hectic life and also clueless about childcare, J.C. arranges to give the child up for adoption, but she grows attached to Elizabeth, forcing J.C. to re-evaluate her priorities. She decides to become a working parent and to raise Elizabeth herself, something Steven has no desire to partake in. They amicably break up, and he moves out. 

J.C.'s boss, Fritz Curtis, offers her a chance to become a partner at the firm. CEO Hughes Larrabee is interested in having her manage the account of his major company, The Food Chain. Adjusting to life with Elizabeth, J.C. lands the account, and her protégé Ken Arrenberg is assigned to her team.

Struggling to balance her work and home life, J.C. hires a series of nannies and enrolls Elizabeth in early development classes, as parenthood soon occupies much of her time. When she discovers Ken making decisions without her input, J.C. tells Fritz she wants him off her team. To her surprise, Fritz informs her for the good of the company, Ken will be in charge of the account and J.C. will be reassigned to a lower-profile client, allowing her to spend more time with Elizabeth. Postponing her promotion, Fritz explains that he too was forced to choose between his career and his family.

Humiliated, J.C. quits, and moves with Elizabeth to a farmhouse in Vermont. Purchasing the house without first having seen it in person or having it inspected, she finds it is riddled with problems (failing plumbing and heating, lack of water, bad roof). By winter, she is strapped with escalating repairs needed to her new home, running out of money and patience, and overwhelmed with loneliness. 

On the brink of financial collapse, and suffering a nervous breakdown, J.C. meets local veterinarian Dr. Jeff Cooper. At first annoyed by him, she is opposed to Jeff's overtures and is focused now on returning to New York as fast as possible. Finding a buyer for the house proves almost impossible. She sees an opportunity to sell "gourmet" baby food applesauce she had concocted for Elizabeth from fresh ingredients. After a rough start, it grows into a full-fledged business called "Country Baby". As her business expands and orders start pouring in from all over the country, J.C. and Jeff strike up a romance.

Later, Fritz reaches out to J.C. with an offer from The Food Chain to acquire Country Baby, and she returns to her former firm to meet with Larrabee and her former colleagues. They lay out the multi-million-dollar deal to buy her company and distribute its products nationwide, and offering her a lucrative salary with a Manhattan apartment and other benefits. 

Ready to accept and that she would be back into her original powerful and prestigious former life in corporate career of New York, J.C. has a change of heart and declines Fritz's offer. She is confident she can grow her company herself without having to sacrifice her relationship with Elizabeth and Jeff. J.C. returns home to Jeff and Elizabeth in Vermont, content with her new life as an active mother, girlfriend, and the CEO of her own burgeoning business.

Cast

Production
The film was shot on location in Los Angeles, New York City and Peru, Vermont. Filming took place between November 5, 1986, and February 3, 1987.

Reception

Box office
The film debuted at #3 at the domestic box office, behind Fatal Attraction and Hello Again.
It earned a respectable USD$1,608,924 in its opening weekend in the U.S. and earned approximately $26,712,476 in its entire run.

Critical response
On Rotten Tomatoes, the film has an approval rating of 70% based on reviews from 46 critics, with an average rating of 6/10 and the consensus: "Baby Boom struggles to impart its feminist ideals, but Diane Keaton's winsome leading work helps keep things breezily entertaining." On Metacritic, it has a score of 53% based on reviews from 9 critics, indicating "mixed or average reviews". Audiences polled by CinemaScore gave the film an average grade of "B+" on an A+ to F scale.

Janet Maslin of The New York Times said that the film "isn't much more than a glorified sitcom, but it's funny, and it's liable to hit home." Kevin Thomas of the Los Angeles Times said that the filmmakers were "not afraid to be sophisticated and screwballish in the best '30s tradition, and they know just how far to exaggerate for laughs without leaving touch with reality entirely or destroying sentiment. The humor in Baby Boom is sharp without being heartless." Roger Ebert gave the film three out of four stars, stating that "all of [the film's storyline] is too good to be true, of course, but that's why I enjoyed it." "Baby Boom makes no effort to show us real life. It is a fantasy about mothers and babies and sweetness and love, with just enough wicked comedy to give it an edge. The screenplay, written by producer Nancy Meyers and director Charles Shyer, has some of the same literate charm as their previous film, Irreconcilable Differences, and some of the same sly observation of a generation that wages an interior war between selfishness and good nature."

Keaton's performance was singled out by Pauline Kael from The New Yorker, who described it as "a glorious comedy performance that rides over many of the inanities in this picture (...) Keaton is smashing: the Tiger Lady's having all this drive is played for farce and Keaton keeps you alert to every shade of pride and panic the character feels. She's an ultra-feminine executive, a wide-eyed charmer, with a breathless ditziness that may remind you of Jean Arthur in The More the Merrier."

Baby Booms writers combat a one-dimensional review in which American journalist, writer, and university professor Caryn James expresses her distaste in J.C. "abandon[ing] a high-powered Manhattan career for the joys of life in Vermont with a baby and Sam Shepard." The article, published on August 13, 1989, by The New York Times, explains how J.C.'s search for equality prompted her to leave her elite New York position. According to its writers, Baby Boom depicts "the increasing prejudice women face today" stereotyped into two categories – the sweet caregiver or the self-reliant businesswoman – and aims to destroy that outdated mindset.

Accolades

 Golden Globe for Best Actress in a Comedy or Musical - Diane Keaton (Nominated)
 Golden Globe Best Motion Picture Comedy or Musical (Nominated)
 National Society of Film Critics Award for Best Actress - Diane Keaton (Nominated)
 American Comedy Awards Funniest Actress in a Motion Picture - Diane Keaton (Nominated)

References

External links
 
 
 
 

1987 films
1987 romantic comedy films
1980s business films
American business films
American romantic comedy films
1980s English-language films
Films adapted into television shows
Films directed by Charles Shyer
Films scored by Bill Conti
Films set in New York City
Films set in Vermont
Films shot in Los Angeles
Films shot in New York City
Films shot in Vermont
Films with screenplays by Charles Shyer
Films with screenplays by Nancy Meyers
United Artists films
Films about parenting
1980s American films